Collarette can refer to:
 A small collar
 Collarette (iris), a part of the eye